Maurice Marko Pluskota (born 30 May 1992) is a German basketball player who plays for the PS Karlsruhe Lions of the German ProA. He plays the center position.

Professional career
He joined the PS Karlsruhe Lions in August 2017.

References

External links
Profile at Eurobasket.com
Profile at Karlsruhe Lions website
Profile at German ProA league website
Profile at scoutBasketball
Profile at RealGM
Profile at Proballers

1992 births
Living people
Centers (basketball)
German men's basketball players
PS Karlsruhe Lions players
Sportspeople from Bremerhaven
Cuxhaven BasCats players
Giessen 46ers players
Basketball Löwen Braunschweig players
SG Braunschweig players